Hillsong Young & Free (also known as Hillsong Y&F or simply Young & Free or Y&F) is an Australian contemporary worship music group from Sydney, Australia, where they started making Christian music in 2012 at Hillsong Church. They have released four live albums: We Are Young & Free (2013), Youth Revival (2016), III Live (2018), and All of My Best Friends (2020); they have also released four studio albums: Youth Revival Acoustic (2017), III (2018), III (Studio Sessions) (2019), and III (Reimagined) (2019). Additionally, the group have released three EPs: This Is Living (2015), We Are Young & Free (The Remixes) - EP (2015), and Out Here on a Friday Where It Began (2021).

Background
The group formed in 2012 out of Sydney, Australia, where they were located at Hillsong Church. Their members are worship leaders Aodhan King, Alexander Pappas, Tyler Douglass, Renee Sieff, Ben Tan, and Melodie Wagner. Hillsong United (launched in 1998), the original group, began when the members were all relatively young, since it was started as part of the youth ministry at Hillsong Church. As they started to mature, have families of their own, and take on adulthood, many people at the church felt there was a need for a new group that would aim its message at younger people with a stimulating new sound.

History
Hillsong Young & Free released their first live album, We Are Young & Free, on 1 October 2013. The album debuted and peaked at No. 6 on the ARIA Albums Chart in Australia, also charting on several Billboard charts in the United States, peaking at No. 22 on the Billboard 200 and No. 1 on the Christian Albums chart. Their subsequent release, an extended play, This Is Living, was released on 11 January 2015. The release charted on the Billboard 200 at No. 38 and No. 1 on the Christian Albums chart. Their second extended play, The Remixes, was released on 4 December 2015. Their second live album, Youth Revival, was released on 26 February 2016. On 6 December 2016, it was announced that Hillsong Young & Free was nominated for a Grammy Award in the Best Contemporary Christian Music Album category for Youth Revival. Hillsong Young & Free featured on the track "Marching On" from Rend Collective's album Good News, which was released on 19 January 2018. In 2020, Young & Free's album All of My Best Friends was nominated for the 63rd Grammy Award in the Best Contemporary Christian Music Album category.

Discography

Albums

EPs

Singles

Other charted songs

Featured songs 

 "Relentless (Young & Free Remix)" (2014) / Hillsong UNITED – The White Album
 "Alive" (2014) / Hillsong Worship – No Other Name (only DVD)
 "Sinking Deep" (2014) / Hillsong Worship – No Other Name (only DVD)
 "This Is Living" (2015) / Hillsong Worship – Open Heaven / River Wild (digital deluxe edition and DVD)
 "Pursue/All I Need Is You" (2015) / Hillsong Worship – Open Heaven / River Wild (digital deluxe edition and DVD)
 "Marching On (featuring Hillsong Young & Free)" (2018) / Rend Collective – Good News

Music videos

 "Alive" (2013)
 "Wake" (2013)
 "Back to Life" (2013)
 "Gracious Tempest" (special performance) (2014)
 "This Is Living" (2015)
 "Where You Are" (2016)
 "Real Love" (2016)
 "Falling Into You" (2016)
 "Love Won't Let Me Down" (2017)
 "P E A C E" (2018)
 "Let Go" (2018)

References

External links
 

Musical groups established in 2012
Gospel music groups
Australian Christian musical groups
2012 establishments in Australia
Performers of contemporary worship music